Cho Sung-dal (born 8 December 1935) is a former South Korean footballer who competed in the 1964 Summer Olympics.

Honours
ROK Marine Corps
Korean National Championship: 1957, 1959

Kyung Hee University
Korean National Championship: 1960, 1961

Korea Electric Power
Korean Semi-professional League (Spring): 1965
Korean Semi-professional League (Autumn): 1967
Korean National Championship: 1962, 1965

Individual
KASA Best Korean Footballer: 1965

References

External links
 Cho Sung-dal at KFA 
 
 

1935 births
Living people
South Korean footballers
Olympic footballers of South Korea
Footballers at the 1964 Summer Olympics
Kyung Hee University alumni
People from Cheongju
Association football forwards
Sportspeople from North Chungcheong Province